Gwinear Downs is a hamlet in the parish of Crowan, Cornwall, England. It is in the civil parish of Camborne.

References

Villages in Cornwall